Double Bridges is a locality located in the Shire of East Gippsland of Victoria, Australia.

References 

Towns in Victoria (Australia)
Shire of East Gippsland